Ajay Monga (born 1968) is an Indian scriptwriter and film director. He has written films like Corporate which starred Bipasha Basu and Kay Kay Menon and Fashion both directed by Madhur Bhandarkar.

He has also written a supernatural thriller Flat! which was released in 2010.

He completed his debut feature film Padduram as a writer-director. Ajay wrote the story, screenplay and dialogues of the web-series 'The Whistleblower' which is available to watch on Sony Liv, an OTT platform.

Early life and education

Monga has done his schooling from St. Anne's High School, Orlem Malad ...He did his graduation from Jai Hind College Churchgate. He has done his Advertising & Marketing Management subsequently from Xavier's Institute of Communications Mumbai.

In school as well as in college Monga was associated with various cultural societies and groups. After college he was a part of Ekjute a theatre group run by Nadira Babbar.

Career

Monga started his career as a copywriter with an advertising agency ADVIEWS. He became the business development head of the company and then set up his own Marketing & Management Consultancy outfit. Later he branched out into television as a writer, producer and director.

Monga has also conceived and designed a non-academic platform for kids 'Chhoton Ka Funda'.

Filmography

Writer
Flat!
Fashion
Corporate
Padduram
The Whistleblower (Web Series)

Creative Producer
Bas Ek Pal

Director
Barabar  (Equal) (Short Feature)
Padduram

Nominations

Star Screen 2008 - Best story Fashion  (Nom.)
Filmfare 2008 - Best Screenplay Fashion  (Nom.)
Cine Blitz 2008 Best Story Fashion   (Nom.)
 IIFA 2009 - Best Story

Books
Skin Deep

Television Foray

Monga's television foray Ad Mad Show was a comedy show which was aired in 1996 on Zee TV - (List of programs broadcast by Zee TV). The show found maximum acceptability amongst college kids who started experimenting with the wacky concept of ad-mad games in schools & colleges.

Copyright infringement claim 

Monga has filed a copyright infringement case on Red Chillies Entertainment for the story screenplay of Om Shanti Om.

External links
 https://web.archive.org/web/20110718043755/http://www.punemirror.in/index.aspx?page=article&sectid=19&contentid=200811222008112204184051347fa014d&sectxslt=&pageno=3
 http://timesofindia.indiatimes.com/India/OSO_a_copy_of_my_script_alleges_scriptwriter_Ajay_Monga/rssarticleshow/3337446.cms
 https://web.archive.org/web/20090510230900/http://www.iifa.com/web07/showcase/2009-nomineelist.htm
 https://web.archive.org/web/20120223142334/http://www.mumbaimirror.com/index.aspx?page=article&sectid=30&contentid=2009060420090604021922918c5fa5acb

References

Hindi screenwriters
Hindi-language film directors
Indian male screenwriters
Living people
1968 births
Hindi film producers
Indian television directors